Heidy Rodríguez may refer to:
 Heidy Rodríguez (karateka) (born 1981), karateka from the Dominican Republic
 Heidy Rodríguez (volleyball) (born 1993), Cuban volleyball player